The Party of the Democratic Revolution (PRD) is a social democratic political party in Mexico. The PRD originated from the Democratic Current, a political faction formed in 1986 from the Institutional Revolutionary Party (PRI). The PRD was formed after the contested general election in 1988, which the PRD's immediate predecessor, the National Democratic Front, believed was rigged by the PRI. This sparked a movement away from the PRI's authoritarian rule.

As of 2020, the PRD is a member of the Va por México coalition. Internationally, the PRD is a member of the Progressive Alliance. The members of the party are known colloquially in Mexico as Perredistas.

History

Early origins

Break from the PRI (1986–1988) 
The PRD has its origins with the leftist members of the PRI, Institutional Revolutionary Party. The PRI had dominated Mexican politics since its founding in 1929. In 1986, a group of PRI members – including Ifigenia Martínez, Rodolfo González Guevara, Porfirio Muñoz Ledo, and Cuauhtémoc Cárdenas – formed the Democratic Current, a political faction within the PRI. The Democratic Current aimed to pressure the PRI to become a more democratic party and to address the issue of national debt including the social effects of the economic crisis that came from attempting to pay that debt. The Democratic Current was also against technocratization, in which the people in power had not held public office and were scholars that were often educated abroad. Under the Miguel de la Madrid presidency which lasted from 1982–1988, the PRI and Mexico were moving towards a technocracy especially since de la Madrid was a technocrat himself. The Democratic Current did not have many technocrats and was thus left out of the decision-making process. This political marginalization led the Democratic Current members to be more vocal about their concerns because they did not have a position of power to protect within the PRI.

After public criticisms and debate between the Democratic Current and the PRI, ten Democratic Current members signed Working Document Number One which was the official beginning of the Democratic Current. However, the PRI refused to acknowledge the Democratic Current as an organization unless they joined a union, which was allowed in the PRI. The forming of a group that was not united because of work but because of difference in ideology within the PRI caused fear of division within the party.

Once de la Madrid's six-year term as president was coming to a close, the PRI chose six possible candidates for president and notably did not choose Cárdenas. The PRI had no process to apply as candidate so Cárdenas could not run as a candidate for president. On October 4, 1987 Carlos Salinas de Gortari was ultimately chosen as the PRI candidate. Gortari did not embody anything that the Democratic Current wanted and many of the Democratic Current members left the PRI including Cárdenas during November 1987. Some Democratic Current members went on to support Cárdenas in his 1988 quest for presidency and help in the founding of the PRD.

1988 presidential election
On October 12, 1987 Cárdenas became the Authentic Party of the Mexican Revolution's presidential candidate. Cárdenas still remained an independent candidate due to electoral laws which meant that many parties could choose Cárdenas as their candidate. The groups of the independent left that supported Cárdenas were the Socialist Mexican Party which included the Unified Socialist Party of Mexico, the Mexican Workers' Party, the Patriotic Revolutionary Party, the Communist Left Unity, and the People's Revolutionary Movement. The parastatal groups, state-owned enterprises that are separate from government, that supported Cárdenas were the Authentic Party of the Mexican Revolution, Popular Socialist Party, and the Party of the Cardenist Front of National Reconstruction, which made up the National Democratic Front. Other groups that supported Cárdenas were the Social Democratic Party, Ecologist Green Party of Mexico, Democratic Unity, Critical Point Revolutionary Organization, and Neighborhood Assembly

In the 1988 presidential election Cárdenas had come closer than any other political candidate to winning against the PRI, which had been in power since 1929. The victory of the PRI's candidate, Carlos Salinas de Gortari, in 1988 was largely considered electoral fraud after the computers tabulating votes had reportedly crashed. Years later, it was determined that there was indeed electoral fraud in the election.

Founding
The 1988 election sparked a movement against the authoritarian rule of the PRI. As an integral part of the movement towards democracy, the Party of the Democratic Revolution was formed as Mexico's only leftwing party. On May 5, 1989, Cárdenas declared the establishment of the PRD. Former PRI members who also helped found the PRD include: Cárdenas, Porfirio Muñoz Ledo, Ifigenia Martínez y Hernández and Andrés Manuel López Obrador.

The party was founded by smaller left-wing parties such as the Mexican Communist Party (PCM, Mexican Communist Party), Unified Socialist Party of Mexico (PSUM, Unified Socialist Party of Mexico), Socialist Mexican Party (PMS, Socialist Mexican Party) and Mexican Workers' Party (PMT, Mexican Workers' Party). The PMS donated its registration with the Federal Electoral Commission (CFE) to enable the new party to be established.

First decade (1989–1999) 
Small leftist group leaders joined the PRD which left small leftist organizations vulnerable. Additionally, some leftist organizations were wary that their individual concerns would be lost by joining a political group.

In the early years, the PRD was not successful in elections because of electoral fraud. The PRD often claimed that the PRI was participating in electoral fraud. This was in contrast to PAN, the conservative party, who chose to cooperate with the PRI. However, the PRD also cooperated with the PRI to make policy changes that moved towards democracy.

Salinas, PRI member and president of Mexico from 1988 to 1994, had made some improvements to the Mexican economy but Mexico still did not have a democratic system. During this time the PRD had become involved with many social justice movements against the neoliberal and antidemocratic policies of the PRI. However, because the PRD began as a combination of many groups, there were many viewpoints and it was difficult to form a unified front. Additionally, the PRD had a difficult time transitioning from a movement with a non-negotiable goal to a party that pushed gradual reforms.

1994 presidential election: Cárdenas
Cárdenas ran for national presidency under the PRD in 1994. Cárdenas ran against Diego Fernández, PAN candidate, and PRI party winner of the election, Ernesto Zedillo Ponce. Cárdenas made the Alianza Democrática Nacional campaign, where he mobilized 57 organizations. Cárdenas did not cooperate well with the PRD and was sometimes contradictory to the PRD.

The PRI used its media influence to promote the idea that changing the governing party would disrupt the nation as well as to portray Cárdenas and the PRD as confrontational and violent.

After his loss Cárdenas claimed fraud; however, the party did not support him and instead focused on winning seats in congress.

1994 presidential election aftermath
In 1997, the PRD won its first governorship with Cárdenas as governor of Mexico City. The PRD also gained the second largest majority in the Chamber of Deputies. These victories were due in part to changes in electoral rules.

This division between currents was seen during the internal election of March 14, 1999 when there were voting discrepancies.

By the end of 1999, 650 PRD members of the PRD had been assassinated, mostly by the PRI, as a way to intimidate those working towards democracy, civic engagement, and social movements.

Second decade (1999–2009)

2000 presidential election: Cárdenas
After the election of Vicente Fox, PAN candidate, the PRD announced that it would not file any complaints about the elections. This was a shift in strategy from the usual protests of fraud. However, some local PRD activists groups filed complaints but these were turned down by the PRD and the electoral court.

2006 presidential election
The former mayor of Mexico City, Andrés Manuel López Obrador, was the presidential candidate for the "Coalición por el Bien de Todos" (Coalition for the Good of All) in the 2006 presidential elections. López Obrador ran against Felipe Calderón, PAN candidate, and Roberto Madrazo, PRI candidate.

López Obrador's campaign relied on citizen's networks (redes ciudadanas) that focused on mobilizing the public to campaign. This strategy focused on López Obrador as an individual and not the PRD. This was worrisome to PRD leaders because they thought that the PRD's concerns would not be addressed. However, many party members thought that López Obrador would win so these concerns were not addressed.

After the general election of July 2, 2006, and a recount of the 9.09% of the ballot tally sheets which supposedly presented irregularities, the Federal Electoral Institute recorded the vote results in favor of Felipe Calderón by a margin of 0.58 percent, about 243,000 votes. These results were later validated by the Federal Electoral Tribunal. However, the PRD claimed that there was election fraud. The claims of election fraud have been rejected by the Federal Electoral Tribunal (TEPJF), which considered these "notoriously out of order" ("notoriamente improcedente") and certified PAN's candidate Felipe Calderón as the winner.

López Obrador then rallied his supporters to hold demonstrations in the capital, Mexico City. These demonstrations were organized by the PRD, whose stronghold is in Mexico City. The PRD had called for demonstrations and set up camps in the capital's main square, blocking one of its main avenues (Paseo de la Reforma) for six weeks to demand a recount of all votes, which was not granted. The camps were later dismantled after confrontation with the Mexican Army became likely.

On September 5, the Federal Electoral Tribunal announced that there was not enough evidence of electoral fraud which legitimized Calderon as President. This caused López Obrador to maintain his campaign of civil disobedience and declared himself as "Legitimate President" in a "public open vote" (people in the main square raising their hands). López Obrador did not recognize the legitimacy of Calderón as president. The PRD was criticized for not complying with the democratic system that it had lauded and helped create. However, the PRD could not agree on whether they should move forward and cooperate with the current system and contribute to policy or take on an uncompromising stance in an attempt to overturn the current system. This split later trickled on to other things such as electoral and petroleum reforms where one part of the party wanted to cooperate while the other refused to out of allegiance to López Obrador.

In 2008 after bitter infighting within the party Jesús Ortega, an opponent of Andrés Manuel López Obrador, was elected party president. In the 2009 legislative elections, López Obrador supported two smaller parties while maintaining his ties to the PRD.

Videoscandals
The party had enjoyed a reputation of honesty unmatched by its competitors, until the "Video Scandals" a series of videos where notable party members were taped receiving cash funds or betting large sums of money in a Las Vegas casino.

Later, another video was recorded by Cuba's government where Carlos Ahumada, the man providing the money, states that members of the PRI and PAN, PRD's rivals, were planning the situation presented in the first video as part of a plot against Andrés Manuel López Obrador to discredit him as a possible presidential candidate.

Party members who were seen on the video tapes were expelled from the party, but those who were supposedly associated, but never legally charged, are still active members.

Modern era (2009–present)

2012 presidential election

López Obrador ran for president again in 2012, but lost to Enrique Peña Nieto.

After the loss, López Obrador told a rally in Mexico City's main plaza Zocalo on 9 September 2012 that he would withdraw from the Democratic Revolution Party "on the best of terms," as well as the Labor Party and Citizens' Movement (MC). He added that he was working on founding a new party from the Movement for National Regeneration, which he would later name MORENA.

2018 presidential election: Ricardo Anaya

The defeat of the PAN and the PRD in the Mexico general elections in 2012, as well as the departure of Andrés Manuel López Obrador from the PRD, caused these two parties to approach each other despite the friction obtained in the 2006 general elections.

During 2017, Ricardo Anaya, then President of PAN, announced his party's proposal to create an alliance of politicians called "Opposition Wide Front" in order to "form a coalition government that will result in a stable majority that can be governed the country and make the change of regime a reality."

On 5 September the PAN formalized an alliance with PRD and MC under the name of "Citizen Front for Mexico," registering the coalition before the National Electoral Institute, an alliance to last for 6 years.

On 17 December, the three parties ratified the alliance with the creation of an electoral coalition to participate in the federal elections of 2018 and multiple state elections with the name of "Por México al Frente."

2018 presidential election aftermath 
In August 2018 PRD abandoned Por México al Frente. In early 2019, the PRD split, with 9 deputies leaving the PRD and joining Morena and the government coalition of López Obrador. This gave the government a two-thirds majority, allowing for the passage of constitutional reform.

On 22 December 2020, the PRD formed the new alliance Va por México, together with the National Action Party and the Institutional Revolutionary Party.

Electoral history

Presidential elections

Congressional elections

Chamber of Deputies

Senate elections

Governorships
Source:

Mexico D.F.

Zacatecas

Tlaxcala

Baja California Sur

Michoacán

Guerrero

Chiapas

Tabasco

Morelos

Oaxaca

Puebla

Sinaloa

Principles
The PRD believes that Mexico currently has major problems of economic and social inequality that halt social development and affect liberty and democratic coexistence. Which is why the PRD has developed the following principles for their political party.

 Democracy
The PRD considers democracy to be the most fundamental principle that it hopes to establish in Mexico. 
The PRD believes that democracy is the political regime that should be established in society because the ruling power goes to the people through voting. 
The internal organization of the party should be democratic. 
The PRD believes that democracy in Mexico is strengthened by an open, democratic, and transparent system of parties.
The PRD acknowledges the diversity of Mexico and is committed to preserve and develop it.
The PRD is also committed to a secular state in which there can be liberty, tolerance, and coexistence between all people.

 Human rights
The PRD is against any form of segregation or discrimination.
The PRD fights to promote, expand, respect, protect, and guarantee the exercise of human rights understood in its most broad meaning which includes:
civil rights
political rights
economic rights
social rights
cultural rights
environmental rights
right to access to information
right to solidarity for the collective benefit for all citizens
and rights of ethnic groups
The PRD also emphasizes these rights in regard to the following groups
young people
children
women
senior citizens
the lesbian, gay, transsexual, transgender, bisexual and intersexual community
migrant workers in the nation and abroad.
The PRD recognizes indigenous communities as equal in regard to the human rights that they are entitled to, with differences that must be respected. 
These differences include their:
traditions
culture
forms of social expression
and language.
The human rights that they are entitled to include: 
right to self autonomy
right to their land
right to the use of their land
right to conservation
right to collectively use their natural resources
right to access to economic development.
The PRD believes it is an obligation of the state to support with public policy and methods necessary to guarantee the development of all indigenous communities and towns.
The PRD sustains the fundamental principle of the San Andrés Accords.
The PRD is also against the death penalty, militarization of police, and military jurisdiction to crimes and misdemeanors of civic order.

 Substantive equality and diversity in regard to sexual orientation
The PRD believes in the equality between women and men as well as gender mainstreaming. 
The PRD champions the access to the same treatment and opportunities between men and women.
The PRD strives for women to have access to exercise their human, sexual, and reproductive rights and to make choices about their body in a free and informed manner.
The PRD promotes gender equality in all social spheres which are manifested in patriarchal and machismo-based power relations that threaten the dignity of women.

 Education, science, and culture
The PRD defends the educational principles that inspired the third article of the constitution and alights itself with an education -from beginning education to university- that is secular, public, free, scientific, and of quality, as well as an education that strengthens national identity.

 Economy
The PRD, since its founding, believes that the state should have jurisdiction and should intervene in the fundamental and prioritized areas of the productive sector, as are nutrition, production of clean energy, telecommunications, the process of technology, infrastructure, communication mediums, financial systems, and technology trade for the national and regional development, restraining ownership and dominion of hydrocarbons and radio-electric spectrum for the nation and the recovery of basic goods that guarantee sovereignty.

 Social justice
The PRD defends the rights of every Mexican worker, the preservation and expansion of social security and the permanent improvements of contractual conditions.

 Environment
The PRD adopts the principle of sustainable development as well as preserving the cultural environment. The PRD does this to satisfy the necessities of current and future generations, based on the responsible use of natural resources, including new tools for development, that would allow for the protection and recovery of the environment with comprehensive public policy.

 International scope
The PRD supports the self-determination of communities, non-intervention, legal equality of states, the cooperation for national development and sovereignty and the respect and incorporation of international treaties to legislation.

Internal organization
The PRD consists of: congresses, councils, and executive committees, an assembly, and a committee. The nation, states, and municipalities have the same organization. They each have a congress, a council, and an executive committee. Congress has the most authority, the council coordinates communication between congresses, and the executive committee applies the guidelines set in place by the council. The maximum rule for any elected position is three years. The national, state, and municipal president cannot be reelected for the same position. The PRD has an anti-discriminatory policy for its internal elections. The PRD has policies put in place that guarantee the inclusion of women, young people, and indigenous people.

The National Congress is the maximum authority of the PRD. The National Congress approves the statue, the declaration of principles, the program, and the political organization of the party. 90% of the National Congress is made up from delegates elected in municipal assemblies. The rest of the National Congress is made up by two delegates for each State Council, the presidents of the State Councils, the members of the National Executive Committee, and by the elected delegates of the National Council that shall not exceed 4% of the total delegates in the Party's Congress. The National Council chooses the majority of its 21-member executive committee except for the president of the party, the secretary of the party, and the parliamentary group coordinators.

In 2014, the PRD became the first political party to have internal elections organized by the Federal Electoral Institute where those affiliated with the party could vote for the members of the National Congress and Council as well as State and Municipal Councils. 2 million people participated in the internal elections which is about 45% of those affiliated with the party.

Currents 
Inside the PRD, there are "currents" that are dedicated to specific approaches and stances or about specific themes or movements. These include:
 National Democratic Alternative (Alternativa Democrática Nacional)
 New Left (Nueva Izquierda)
 New Sun Forum (Foro Nuevo Sol)
 National Democratic Left (Izquierda Democrática Nacional)
 Political Action Group (Grupo Acción Política)

Presidents

See also
Politics of Mexico
List of political parties in Mexico
History of democracy in Mexico

References

Further reading

Bruhn, Kathleen. "PRD local governments in Michoacan: implications for Mexico’s democratization process." Subnational Politics and Democratization in Mexico (1999): 19-48.

 
Progressive Alliance
Social democratic parties in Mexico
1989 establishments in Mexico
Foro de São Paulo
Full member parties of the Socialist International
Institutional Revolutionary Party breakaway groups
Organizations based in Mexico City
Political parties established in 1989